Ivan Babić (born 29 April 1984) is a Croatian  footballer who plays in Austria for SC Schachendorf, as a striker.

References

External links
 
 Ivan Babic Profile at ifball.com 

1984 births
Living people
Footballers from Zagreb
Association football forwards
Croatian footballers
NK Zagreb players
NK Inter Zaprešić players
NK Istra 1961 players
FC Zvezda Irkutsk players
NK Međimurje players
HNK Cibalia players
NK Croatia Sesvete players
KS Kastrioti players
Ethnikos Achna FC players
Sarawak FA players
Negeri Sembilan FA players
DRB-Hicom F.C. players
Croatian Football League players
Russian First League players
Kategoria Superiore players
Cypriot First Division players
Croatian expatriate footballers
Malaysia Premier League players
Expatriate footballers in Russia
Croatian expatriate sportspeople in Russia
Expatriate footballers in Albania
Croatian expatriate sportspeople in Albania
Expatriate footballers in Cyprus
Croatian expatriate sportspeople in Cyprus
Expatriate footballers in Malaysia
Croatian expatriate sportspeople in Malaysia
Expatriate footballers in Austria
Croatian expatriate sportspeople in Austria